The Schiller Memorial Prize is a literature prize of the State of
Baden-Württemberg. It is endowed with 25,000 euros and has been awarded since 1955 on Friedrich Schiller's birthday, 10 November. The award was donated on the occasion of the 150th anniversary of Friedrich Schiller's death and is presented every three years. The prize acknowledges outstanding work in the field of German literature or intellectual history, for single works or collected works. At the same time, there are also two lesser prizes with 7,500 euros awarded for young dramatists.

Prize winners

1955 Rudolf Kassner
1957 Rudolf Pannwitz
1959 Wilhelm Lehmann
1962 Werner Bergengruen
1962 Heinar Kipphardt
1965 Max Frisch
1968 Günter Eich
1971 Gerhard Storz
1974 Ernst Jünger
1977 Golo Mann
1980 Martin Walser
1983 Christa Wolf
1986 Friedrich Dürrenmatt
1989 Käte Hamburger
1992 Volker Braun
1995 Peter Handke
1998 
2001 Alexander Kluge
2004 Christoph Hein
2007 Botho Strauß
2010 Tankred Dorst
2013 Rainald Goetz
2016 Ror Wolf
2019 Nino Haratischwili
2022 Julia Franck

References

Awards established in 1955
German literary awards
1955 establishments in Germany